Round Mountain is a town in Blanco County, Texas, United States. The population was 181 at the 2010 census.

Geography

Round Mountain is located in northern Blanco County at  (30.436308, –98.354130), along U.S. Route 281.

Climate

The climate in this area is characterized by hot, humid summers and generally mild to cool winters.  According to the Köppen Climate Classification system, Round Mountain has a humid subtropical climate, abbreviated "Cfa" on climate maps.

Demographics

2020 census

As of the 2020 United States census, there were 101 people, 57 households, and 31 families residing in the town.

2000 census
As of the census of 2000, there were 111 people, 41 households, and 33 families residing in the town. The population density was 48.3 people per square mile (18.6/km2). There were 46 housing units at an average density of 20.0 per square mile (7.7/km2). The racial makeup of the town was 87.39% White, 9.01% from other races, and 3.60% from two or more races. Hispanic or Latino of any race were 18.02% of the population.

There were 41 households, out of which 29.3% had children under the age of 18 living with them, 73.2% were married couples living together, 4.9% had a female householder with no husband present, and 19.5% were non-families. 17.1% of all households were made up of individuals, and 12.2% had someone living alone who was 65 years of age or older. The average household size was 2.71 and the average family size was 3.06.

In the town, the population was spread out, with 25.2% under the age of 18, 7.2% from 18 to 24, 19.8% from 25 to 44, 32.4% from 45 to 64, and 15.3% who were 65 years of age or older. The median age was 43 years. For every 100 females, there were 85.0 males. For every 100 females age 18 and over, there were 88.6 males.

The median income for a household in the town was $39,500, and the median income for a family was $44,375. Males had a median income of $30,938 versus $25,833 for females. The per capita income for the town was $16,220. There were no families and 2.3% of the population living below the poverty line, including no under eighteens and none of those over 64.

References

External links
 

Towns in Blanco County, Texas
Towns in Texas